Henry Solomon McKenzie (died June 23, 1974) was an American newspaper publisher and politician. He was a member of the Florida legislature for 38 years and publisher of the Palatka Herald newspaper in Palatka, Florida. He is buried at Oak Hill Cemetery in Palatka, Florida.

References

Further reading

American newspaper publishers (people)
1880s births
1974 deaths
Florida state senators
20th-century American politicians